The Cop is a 1970 French-Italian crime film directed by Yves Boisset that stars Michel Bouquet and Françoise Fabian. With considerable moral ambiguity, it tells the story of a committed policeman in a crooked force who concludes that the only way to avenge the murder of a colleague by criminals is to use their own weapons of beatings and shootings. Its portrayal of police corruption and violence led to demands from French government ministers for extensive cuts or a total ban and in the end the French release had a few cuts.

Plot
Inspector Favenin, after being posted away for indiscipline, returns to duty and links up with his old friend Barnero. The two start investigating the murder of Dassa, a bar owner who refused to let his premises be used for distributing the drugs of Tavernier, the local crime lord who is protected by police and politicians. When Dassa's sister arrives to settle his affairs, the goons who murdered her brother beat her up and wreck the bar.

Rover, an old friend of Dassa, hides the girl on his stud farm and decides to get revenge. He enlists Villetti, a fellow ex-mercenary, to murder Tavernier as he leaves his private gambling club. An alibi is secured from a third colleague, Aulnay, who will swear that the two were playing cards with him and his wife. Rover and Villetti succeed in murdering Tavernier but, as they escape along the roof, encounter Favenin and Barnero. The warning shots of the two policemen are returned and Barnero is killed.

When Favenin's demand to lead the hunt for the killer in his own way is accepted, he first tracks down the two goons who were also in the club. After shooting one for failure to co-operate, he gets the name of Villetti from the other. Tracking down Villetti, he explains to him that the only sure way to get revenge will be to shoot him. Villetti agrees, but points out before the trigger is pulled that this makes Favenin no better than a criminal. Meanwhile the police have tracked down and arrested Rover, who gives nothing away despite being beaten. Favenin tracks down Aulnay, who persists in the false alibi despite a beating.

After this trail of beatings and deaths, Favenin is again suspended and, sending his wife away to safety, stays alone in his riverside home. Aulnay tracks him down and informs both Rover, who is in jail pending trial, and Dassa's sister. The girl goes to confront Favenin, but both are unaware that Rover has escaped. Guessing where he will be heading, a srong force of police surround Favenin's house. When the armed Rover confronts Favenin, police fire brings him down. Favenin hands over a written report of his investigations, which ends with his resignation.

Cast
 Michel Bouquet as L'inspecteur Favenin
 Françoise Fabian as Hélène Dassa
 Gianni Garko as Dan Rover (as John Garko)
 Michel Constantin as Viletti
 Rufus as Raymond Aulnay
 Anne Carrère as Christine
 Théo Sarapo as Lupo
 Henri Garcin as Georges Duval, dit 'Georgy Beausourire'
 Pierre Massimi as Robert Dassa
 Bernard Fresson as L'inspecteur Barnero
 Adolfo Celi as Le commissaire principal / Chief of police
 Jean-Claude Bercq as Germain (as Jean-Claude Berck)
 Serge Nubret as Le Noir

References

External links

1970 films
1970 crime films
French crime films
1970s Italian-language films
French films about revenge
Films directed by Yves Boisset
1970s French-language films
1970s French films